The men's 100 yards event at the 1958 British Empire and Commonwealth Games was held on 17 and 19 July at the Cardiff Arms Park in Cardiff, Wales.

Medalists

Results

Heats
Qualification: First 3 in each heat (Q) qualify directly for the quarterfinals.

Wind:Heat 1: +1.1 m/s, Heat 9: +3.7 m/s, Heat 12: +0.5 m/s

Quarterfinals
Qualification: First 2 in each heat (Q) qualify directly for the semifinals.

Wind:Heat 1: 0.0 m/s, Heat 3: -1.4 m/s, Heat 5: -0.2 m/s

Semifinals
Qualification: First 3 in each heat (Q) qualify directly for the final.

Wind:Heat 1: -3.9 m/s, Heat 2: ? m/s

Final

References

Athletics at the 1958 British Empire and Commonwealth Games
1958